Sigismund Pirchan von Rosenberg, O. Cist. (1389–1472) was a Roman Catholic prelate who served as Auxiliary Bishop of Passau (1441–1472).

Biography
Sigismund Pirchan von Rosenberg was born in 1389 and ordained a priest in the Cistercian Order. In 1441, he was appointed during the papacy of Pope Eugene IV as Auxiliary Bishop of Passau  and Titular Bishop of Salona. He served as Auxiliary Bishop of Passau until his death on 15 June 1472.

References

External links and additional sources
 (for Chronology of Bishops) 
 (for Chronology of Bishops) 

15th-century Roman Catholic bishops in Bavaria
Bishops appointed by Pope Eugene IV
1389 births
1472 deaths
Cistercian bishops
People from Český Krumlov District